Pond turtle may refer to:
 Emydidae, a family of pond turtles
 Emys, a genus of Emydidae
 European pond turtle (Emys orbicularis)
 Sicilian pond turtle (Emys trinacris)
 Western pond turtle (Actinemys marmorata or Emys marmorata)
 Giant Asian pond turtle (Heosemys grandis)
 Mauremys, a genus of pond turtles
 Chinese pond turtle (Mauremys reevesii)
 Japanese pond turtle (Mauremys japonica)
 Philippine forest turtle or Leyte pond turtle (Heosemys leytensis)

Animal common name disambiguation pages